Deliver Us From Evil is a thriller novel written by David Baldacci. This is the second installment in the book series featuring A. Shaw and Katie James. The book was initially published on April 20, 2010, by Grand Central Publishing.

References

External links

2010 American novels
Novels by David Baldacci
Grand Central Publishing books